Steve Pierce (born 1950) is an American politician from Arizona. Pierce was a Republican member of the Arizona House of Representatives for District 1, serving until 2021. He was a member of the Arizona Senate from the 1st district. He was president of the Arizona State Senate from November 10, 2011 through 2013.

Early life 
In 1950, Pierce was born in Phoenix, Arizona. Pierce was raised in Prescott, Arizona. Pierce attended Prescott High School.

Education 
In 1972, Pierce earned a Bachelor of Science degree in Animal science from University of Arizona.

Career 
Pierce's career began as a rancher.

Pierce's political career began in 2009 when he became the Majority Whip in Arizona State Senate.
In November 2011, Pierce became the President of Arizona State Senate until January 2013.

On March 27, 2019, when David Stringer resigned, Pierce was selected by county supervisors in April 2019 to become a member of the Arizona House of Representatives for District 1.

Personal life 
Pierce's wife is Joan. They have four children. Pierce lives in Prescott, Arizona.

References

External links 
 

1950 births
Arizona state senators
Living people
Presidents of the Arizona Senate
University of Arizona alumni
21st-century American politicians
Politicians from Prescott, Arizona
Members of the Arizona House of Representatives